Chiba (written: 千葉 lit. "thousand leaves") is a Japanese surname. Notable people with the surname include:

Akira Chiba, president of The Pokémon Company
Chiemi Chiba (born 1975), Japanese voice actress and singer
Ginko Chiba, a gymnast at the 1964 Summer Olympics
Isshin Chiba (born 1968), Japanese voice actor
Kanta Chiba
Kaori Chiba (born 1981), Japanese field hockey player
Kazuo Chiba (born 1940), Japanese Aikido teacher
Keiko Chiba (born 1948), Japanese Minister of Justice
, Japanese rower
Mone Chiba
Reiko Chiba (born 1975), Japanese actress
Ryohei Chiba (born 1984), Japanese singer
 Ryōko Chiba, Japanese shogi player
Saeko Chiba (born 1977), Japanese voice actress
 Sakio Chiba, Japanese shogi player
Shigeru Chiba (born 1954; also known as Masaharu Maeda), Japanese voice actor
Shōya Chiba (born 1995), Japanese voice actor
Shūsaku Narimasa Chiba (1794–1856), founder of the Hokushin Itto school of swordsmanship
Sonny Chiba (1939–2021; also known as Shin'ichi Chiba), Japanese actor and martial artist
Susumu Chiba (born 1970), Japanese voice actor
Takahito Chiba
Teikan Chiba (1852–1913), Japanese prosecutor, judge and politician
Teisuke Chiba (1917–1965), photographer
Tetsuya Chiba (born 1939), Japanese manga artist

Other people
Saïd Chiba (born 1970), Moroccan footballer

Fictional characters
Mamoru Chiba (also known as Darien Shields), the only major male character from the Sailor Moon anime and manga series
Atsuko Chiba, main character of the 2006 film Paprika
Kazunobu Chiba, character in the manga series Case Closed
Kirino Chiba (千葉 紀梨乃), a fictional character from anime Bamboo Blade
, a character in the Assassination Classroom anime and manga

See also

Chiba clan, a Japanese clan
Chiba Prefecture, a prefecture located in the Kantō region
Chika (general name)
Chica (name)
Chyba, another surname

Japanese-language surnames